"I Can't Stop Loving You" is a song by Don Gibson, also recorded by Ray Charles, Conway Twitty, Kitty Wells and others.

I Can't Stop Loving You may also refer to:
 "I Can't Stop Loving You (Though I Try)", song by Billy Nicholls, recorded by Leo Sayer, Phil Collins and others
 "Can't Stop Lovin' You", song by Van Halen
 "Can't Stop Lovin' You" (Aerosmith song), by Aerosmith and Carrie Underwood
 "I Just Can't Stop Loving You", song by Michael Jackson
 "I Can't Stop Loving You", song by Kem
 "Can't Stop Loving You", a song by Tony Waddington and Wayne Bickerton recorded by The Flirtations and Tom Jones, both released 1970
 "Can't Stop Loving You", by James Oliver, contestant for the Eurovision Song Contest 1989
 "Can't Stop Loving You", by Sara Evans and Isaac Slade from Evans' album Slow Me Down